Events in the year 1923 in Norway.

Incumbents
Monarch – Haakon VII

Events

 Otto Blehr resigns as Prime Minister, along with his entire cabinet.
 4 November – the Communist Party of Norway is formed, following a split in the Norwegian Labour Party.
Fokstumyra Nature Reserve is established, the first nature reserve in Norway.

Popular culture

Sports

Music

Film

Literature
 The Knut Hamsund novel Siste Kapitel Volume 1 & 2 (The Last Chapter), was published.
The Olav Duun novel I stormen (The Storm) from the work Juvikfolket (The People of Juvik, 1918–23), was published.

Births

January to March
1 January – Kristin Kverneland Lønningdal, politician (died 2010)
16 January – Martin Stokken, cross country skier and Olympic silver medallist, athlete (died 1984)
22 January – Walter Kåre Tjønndal, politician (died 2014)
28 January – Erling Lorentzen, Norwegian-born businessman in Brazil (died 2021)
29 January – Leif Næss, rower and Olympic bronze medallist (died 1973)
5 February – Inger Waage, industrial ceramicist (died 1995)
7 February – Egil Abrahamsen, ships engineer
10 February – Hans Goksøyr, businessperson (died 2016)
10 February – Peder I. Ramsrud, politician (died 2014)
13 February – Jens P. Flå, politician (died 2002)
21 February – Gunnar Christie Wasberg, librarian and non-fiction writer (died 2015)
23 February – Jon Fossum, orienteer and politician (died 2007)
7 March – Johannes Vågsnes, politician (died 2012)
9 March – Pelle Christensen, actor and translator (died 1995)
12 March – Hjalmar Andersen, speed skater and triple Olympic gold medallist (died 2013)
12 March – Arne Asper, businessman (died 2017)
29 March – Eystein Bærug, politician (died 1998)

April to June
4 April – Reidar Nyborg, cross country skier and Olympic bronze medallist (died 1990)
13 April – Per Kleppe, economist and politician (died 2021)
30 April – Einar Thorsrud, psychologist, researcher and professor (died 1985)
1 May – Anders John Aune, resistance member and politician (died 2011)
2 May – Albert Nordengen, politician (died 2004)
29 May – Harald Sverdrup, poet and children's writer (died 1992)
14 June – Jakob Weidemann, painter (died 2001)
21 June – Bjørn Paulson, high jumper and Olympic silver medallist, jurist (died 2008)
22 June – Nils Slaatto, architect (died 2001)
29 June – Olav Thon, property developer

July to September
17 July – Wiggo Hanssen, speed skater (died 2007)
18 July – Odvar Omland, politician
26 July – Ole Frithjof Klemsdal, politician (died 2008)
1 August – Erling Stordahl, singer (died 1994)
12 August – Olle Johan Eriksen, politician (died 1999)
13 August – Arnljot Eggen, poet (died 2009)
17 August – Bjørn Erling Ytterhorn, politician (died 1987)
25 August – Stephan Tschudi-Madsen, art historian (died 2007)
30 August – Andreas Bernhard Gamst, politician (died 2015)
3 September – Egil Solin Ranheim, politician (died 1992)
9 September – Erling Rønneberg, politician (died 2008)
11 September – Leiv Magnus Vidvei, economist and politician (died 2016)
13 September – Gunnar Berg, politician (died 2007)
15 September – Rune Nilsen, triple jumper (died 1998)
23 September – Egil Oddvar Larsen, politician (died 2009)

October to December
13 October – Eivind Bolle, politician and Minister (died 2012)
23 October – Sigmund Søfteland, speed skater (died 1993)
26 October – Johnny Lunde, alpine skier (died 2013)
7 November – Reidar Haave Olsen, pilot (died 1944)
10 November – Alf Martin Bjørnø, politician (died 1991)
24 November – Johan Vestly, illustrator (died 1993)
12 December – Frode Nilsen, diplomat (died 2016)
13 December – Ivar Johansen, journalist and editor (died 2005)
15 December – Petter Furberg, politician (died 1999)
15 December – Jon Ola Norbom, economist, politician and Minister (died 2020)
18 December – Sossen Krohg, playwright and stage and film actress (died 2016).
26 December – Rolf Hellem, politician (died 2021)
29 December – Helge Røstad, judge (died 1994)

Full date unknown
Finn-Egil Eckblad, mycologist and professor (died 2000)

Deaths
4 February – Svend Borchmann Hersleb Vogt, jurist and politician (born 1852)
9 February – Otto Aulie, footballer (born 1894)
28 April – Knute Nelson, Governor of Minnesota from 1893 till 1895 and United States Senator from Minnesota from 1895 till 1923. (born 1843)
23 May – Otto Bahr Halvorsen, politician and twice Prime Minister of Norway (born 1872)
22 June – Edvard Sverdrup, theologian (born 1861)
28 July – Christian Emil Stoud Platou, railroad director and politician (born 1861)
11 September – Ole Østmo, rifle shooter and Olympic medallist (born 1866)
23 September – Carl L. Boeckmann, artist (born 1867)
2 November – Claus Høyer, rower and Olympic bronze medallist (born 1891)
16 November – Christen Christensen, shipyard owner, ship-owner and whaling manager (born 1845)
19 November – Ivar Bergersen Sælen, politician and Minister (born 1855)

See also

References

External links

Norway, 1923 In